Hakeem Adeniji (born December 8, 1997) is an American football offensive tackle for the Cincinnati Bengals of the National Football League (NFL). He played college football at Kansas. At Kansas, he was a two-time All-Big 12 selection, making the 1st team in 2019 and 2nd team in 2018. He was drafted in the sixth round (180th overall selection) of the 2020 NFL Draft by the Bengals.

High school
Adeniji attended high school at Garland High School in Texas. In high school, he had committed to play at the United States Air Force Academy. However, he failed to receive a medical waiver to attend due to an allergy to cashews. After failing to receive the waiver, he committed to the University of Kansas.

College career
As a freshman, Adeniji became a starter at tackle immediately, starting all twelve games. Throughout his college career, Adeniji showed durability, not missing a single game due to injury. By the end of his senior year, he had been on the roster for 48 games and started in all of them. In his junior and senior years, he helped pave the way for running back Pooka Williams Jr. to rush for over 1,000 yards in back-to-back seasons. For his efforts, he was named 2nd team All-Big 12 as a junior and 1st team as a senior.

Professional career

NFL Draft
Adeniji was invited to the 2020 NFL Scouting Combine. Although he played tackle at Kansas, NFL Analyst Lance Zierlein said he believed Adeniji may have to move to guard in the NFL.

2020
Adeniji was drafted by the Cincinnati Bengals with the 180th overall selection in the sixth round of the 2020 NFL Draft. In week 8 of the 2020 season, he recorded his first career start at tackle. He helped the Bengals, who had allowed 28 sacks through 7 games, allow zero sacks in the game for the first time all season. He finished his rookie season with five starts and played in fifteen games.

2021
Adeniji tore his pectoral muscle during offseason workouts and had season ending surgery to repair it in June 2021. He was placed on the reserve/non-football injury list following the preseason. He was activated on November 4, 2021. In his first game back from injury, he made his sixth career start against the Cleveland Browns. He finished the season starting in and playing in nine games. He also got the start for the Bengals in their postseason victory over the Las Vegas Raiders, which was the Bengals first playoff win in 31 years.

Personal life
His mother, Joke, was a television anchor in Nigeria before the family moved to the Dallas area. His brother, Moshood, played offensive line at Air Force.

References

External links
 Kansas Profile
 Bengals profile

1997 births
Living people
African-American players of American football
Players of American football from Texas
People from Garland, Texas
Sportspeople from the Dallas–Fort Worth metroplex
American football offensive tackles
Kansas Jayhawks football players
Cincinnati Bengals players
American sportspeople of Nigerian descent
21st-century African-American sportspeople